The 2003–04 Rugby Pro D2 season was the 2003–04 second division of French club rugby union. There is promotion and relegation in Pro Rugby D2, and after the 2003–04 season, Bayonne and FC Auch finished at the top of the table and were promoted to the top level, and Bordeaux-Bègles were relegated to third division.

Standings

Semi-finals
 Bayonne 16 -14 Dax
 Auch 16 - 11 Lyon

Final
 Bayonne 9-26 Auch

See also
 Rugby union in France

External links
 LNR.fr
 Table

2003-04
2003–04 in French rugby union leagues